The 4th season of Indonesian Idol premiered on RCTI on March 30, 2007 and concluded on July 28, 2007. Daniel Mananta and Ata continued to host the show. On the workshop round plus the first two spectacular show, Daniel hosted the show alone due to Ata's pregnancy. Ata started joining Daniel back hosting the show on the third spectacular show. Additionally, Nirina Zubir and Indra Bekti were also announced as the hosts of Idol Banget, a behind-the-scenes show of Indonesian Idol.

Changes were made to the judging team this season. While Titi DJ and Indra Lesmana returned as the judges, due to scheduling difficulties of their career, Indy Barends and Dimas Djayadiningrat had resigned from judging the fourth season of Indonesian Idol. They both were replaced by Anang Hermansyah and Jamie Aditya. Anang, who is the husband of Indonesia's most famous Pop Diva, Krisdayanti, is also known as an established musician as well as a music producer. Jamie Aditya, was a Video Jockey during MTV Asia early years. Tika Panggabean served as guest judge several times during the temporary absence of judges Titi DJ and Jamie Aditya.

Rini Wulandari was announced the winner of the competition on July 28, 2007, defeating runner-up Wilson Maiseka after nearly 2.4 million votes. The split between the two was 51.2 percent to 48.8 percent. After winning, Rini sang the song "Aku Tetap Milikmu", which was the winning song of the Idol Song Competition.

Early process
On Wednesday, January 10, 2007, FremantleMedia Asia officially launched the fourth edition of award-winning Indonesian Idols. The show was initially announced at the 2006 Panasonic Awards when the Indonesian Idols judges were on hand to receive the award for the Best Music and Variety Show. The 4th season commercial also has been airing in RCTI prior to the official launch date. In the official Indonesian Idols website, it was stated that starting from Season 4, future Idols participants can register online and print the audition form rather than using the current registration process which might take up to a whole day to complete. This season saw a big jump in number of applicants. More than 90,000 people turned up for the auditions. Contestants were required to be between the ages 16–28.

Auditions
Auditions were held in the following cities:

Elimination round
Elimination round was held from March 5–7, 2007 at Gedung Kesenian Jakarta. A total of 95 were selected from the twelve audition cities. In the first round, contestants each sang an a cappella solo performance of song of their choice, after which the judges selected who would go home and advance to the next round. The second round had the contestants performing in groups of three. Those who made it to next round performed one more solo song (minus-one). They were cut once again to twenty-four contestants.

Workshop Round
This season featured 24 contestants instead of 28. In addition, instead of one workshop round every week, the workshop round aired every day in marathon at 10PM West Indonesia Time, and there was a separate results show on the following night in the same timeslot.

The schedule was as follows:
 April 16: Top 12 Male Semifinalists Perform
 April 17: Live Result Show (Three Male Contestants Eliminated)
 April 18: Top 12 Female Semifinalists Perform
 April 19: Live Result Show (Three Female Contestants Eliminated)
 April 20: Top 9 Male Semifinalists Perform
 April 21: Live Result Show (Two Male Contestants Eliminated)
 April 23: Top 9 Female Semifinalists Perform
 April 24: Live Result Show (Two Female Contestants Eliminated)
 April 25: Top 7 Male Semifinalists Perform
 April 26: Top 7 Female Semifinalists Perform
 April 27: Live Result Show (Two Male and Two Female Contestants Eliminated, Top 10 Finalists Announced)

Top 24

Top 18

Top 14

Wild Card Round
Four of the eliminated contestants were selected by the judges to compete in the Wild Card round. Two contestants advanced to the final group of 12.

Spectacular Show

Finalists

Spectacular Show 1 – Hits Number 1

Spectacular Show 2 – Rock n Roll

Spectacular Show 3 – Ungkapan Hati
Mentor: Harvey Malaiholo

Spectacular Show 4 – Persembahanku
Mentor: Vina Panduwinata

Spectacular Show 5 – Musik 4 Dekade
Mentor: Yovie Widianto

Spectacular Show 6 – Movie Soundtrack

Spectacular Show 7 – Percussion Night

Spectacular Show 8 – Masterpiece

Spectacular Show 9 – Tribute to Chrisye
Each contestant sang two songs.

Spectacular Show 10 – Tantangan
Each contestant sang two songs.

Grand Finale
Each contestant sang three songs, including judges' choice, The Best Of Spectacular Show & the winner's single.

Withover 10,000 viewers at Balai Sarbini during the Grand Final, it doubled the projection of the producer. Claimed as the largest, most glorious and the best Grand Final of all Idol shows, it beat American Idol in terms of stage size, design, lighting, and sound system. At the same venue a week later, The Result and Reunion Show was held. It had a star-studded list of entertainers making an appearance, including Dewi Sandra, Harvey Malaiholo, Vina Panduwinata, Krisdayanti, Ungu, The Fly, Gita Gutawa, judges Indra Lesmana and Titi DJ, as well as past Idol contestants. For the first time in history, Rini, one of the Grand Finalist (later become the winner), had the chance to sing with Indonesia's music divas, Titi DJ and Krisdayanti.

Guest performances

1 Four alumni of Indonesian Idol, including winner Mike Mohede, Delon, Judika, Lucky performed in a group called Idol Divo.
2 Idol Diva consisted of several previous Indonesian Idol contestants, including Nania, Winda, Karen, Sisi, Monita.

Elimination Chart

References

Indonesian Idol
2007 Indonesian television seasons